Muramatsu is a Japanese surname. Notable people with the surname include:

, Japanese baseball player
 Chihiro Muramatsu, Japanese female tennis player
 Haruki Muramatsu, Japanese darts player
 Jun Muramatsu
, Japanese astronomer
 Muramatsu Shōfu
 Taisuke Muramatsu, Japanese football player
 Tomomi Muramatsu
, Japanese footballer

See also
 5606 Muramatsu, a main-belt asteroid
 Muramatsu, Niigata (村松町), a town located in Nakakanbara District, Niigata, Japan 
 Muramatsu Flutes, a Japanese company that manufactures flutes 

Japanese-language surnames